FK Karpoš 93 is a football club based in the city of Kumanovo, North Macedonia. They currently play in the OFS Kumanovo league.

History
The club was founded in 1993. 

Their biggest success was the playing in the Macedonian Second League in 1996–97 and 1999–2000 season.

References

External links

Club info at MacedonianFootball 
Football Federation of Macedonia 

Karpoš 93
Association football clubs established in 1993
1993 establishments in the Republic of Macedonia